Un papá pirata is a 2019 Mexican comedy-drama film directed by Humberto Hinojosa. The film premiered on 25 October 2019, and is stars Miguel Rodarte, and Luis de la Rosa.

Plot 
The plot revolves around Ian, a 16-year-old rebel teenager, who for his graduation video faces a botarga (mascot) and is forced to work to amend his mistake. Everything will get tangled up when Ian learns that his dad is not his real father. The two have a very close relationship, they are even similar, so this news causes both to be disappointed. Ian embarks on a journey with the objective of finding André, his biological father, who lived his glory days in the 80s as a telenovela actor, but is currently an alcoholic who works as a botarga. What started as a nightmare becomes a lucrative business of clandestine fights and extravagant people who spend the day dressed up as pets.

Cast 
 Miguel Rodarte as André
 Luis de la Rosa as Ian
 Juan Pablo Medina as Gaspar
 Natasha Dupeyrón as Sara
 Marcela Guirado as Cassandra
 Dominika Paleta as Bea
 Ernesto Laguardia as Himserlf
 Adal Ramones as himself
 Andrés Almeida as Jorge
 Paco Rueda as Ambrón
José Luis Slobotzky as Vaquita

References

External links 
 

2019 films
Mexican comedy films
2019 comedy films
2010s Mexican films
2010s Spanish-language films